One Last Time Live in Concert is a documentary of one of singer Tina Turner's final Wembley Stadium concert stops on her Twenty Four Seven Tour. It was directed by David Mallet. The DVD was released nationally in 2001, a year after the tour, which was the highest-grossing tour of 2000, ended.

Setlist
 I Want To Take You Higher
 Absolutely Nothing's Changed
 A Fool in Love
 Acid Queen
 River Deep Mountain High
 We Don't Need Another Hero
 Better Be Good to Me
 Private Dancer
 Let's Stay Together
 What's Love Got To Do With It?
 When the Heartache Is Over
 Baby, I'm a Star (Lisa Fischer and Stacey Campbell)
 Help!
 Whatever You Need
 Sitting on the Dock of the Bay
 Try a Little Tenderness
 I Heard It Through the Grapevine
 Addicted to Love
 The Best
 Proud Mary
 Nutbush City Limits
 Twenty Four Seven

Certifications

Other features
 Backstage with Tina (including interviews)
 Select a Track
 Photo gallery

References

Tina Turner video albums
2001 live albums
2001 video albums
Live video albums
Tina Turner live albums
Live albums recorded at Wembley Stadium